The Société Française de Génie des Procédés (French Society of Process Engineers) or SFGP is a French organization for chemical engineers.  It is a member of the European Federation of Chemical Engineering and acts as joint Secretariat, and of la Fédération Française pour les sciences de la Chimie (FFC).  It publishes a technical journal "Récents progrès en Génie des Procédés", and news for members "Procédique" (first published April 1988), and organizes a congress every alternate year.  As of 2014 its membership is in excess of 600.

Its history dates back to a congress in 1987, 1er Congrès Français de Génie des Procédés, and the formation the following year of a Groupe Français de Génie des Procédés (GFGP), which in 1989 had 340 members. and formally transformed into the present organization in 1997.

Its mission statement is to:
promote Process Engineering.
promote exchanges between academics, trainers and researchers, manufacturers developing and operating processes, engineering companies and suppliers at the national, European and global levels.
build a network of experts to respond to societal challenges and the innovation needs of Process Industries.
be a force for representations to political and institutional decision-makers.

References

Chemical engineering organizations
Engineering societies based in France
Organizations established in 1997
1997 establishments in France